Syntomaria is a monotypic genus of brachiopods belonging to the family Terebratellidae. The only species is Syntomaria curiosa.

The species is found in Eastern Australia and near Southernmost America.

References

Terebratulida
Brachiopod genera
Monotypic brachiopod genera